The ILO Convention Concerning Minimum Age for Admission to Employment C138, is a convention adopted in 1973 by the International Labour Organization. It requires ratifying states to pursue a national policy designed to ensure the effective abolition of child labour and to raise progressively the minimum age for admission to employment or work. It is one of eight ILO fundamental conventions. Convention C138 replaces several similar ILO conventions in specific fields of labour.

Minimum ages
Countries are free to specify a minimum age for labour, with a minimum of 15 years. A declaration of 14 years is also possible when for a specified period of time. Laws may also permit light work for children aged 13–15 (not harming their health or school work). The minimum age of 18 years is specified for work which "is likely to jeopardise the health, safety or morals of young persons". Definitions of the type of work and derogations are only possible after tripartite consultations (if such a system exists in the ratifying country).

Effect on other conventions 
The convention is a revision of several conventions for workers in specific areas. Upon entry into force, some of these conventions were closed for ratification and becoming a party to this convention automatically resulted in denunciation of the older ones. An overview of older minimum age conventions of ILO is shown below:

Ratifications

ILO Convention C138 entered into force one year after deposition of the first two ratifications (Cuba and Libya). As of October 2022 175 countries have ratified Convention C138. Initially, however, the pace of ratification of this convention was extremely slow. Therefore, an alternative Convention with a more limited scope was initiated in 1999. It concerns ILO Convention 182 concerning the Prohibition and Immediate Action for the Elimination of the Worst Forms of Child Labour.

Convention C138 enters into force for a ratifying country one year after ratification. This can be denounced every 10 years in the year after 10 years have passed (e.g.  – ).

References

External links 
 Minimum Age Convention
 List of Ratifications
 General description of ILO Conventions
 Text of the Convention  at the Center for a World in Balance

International Labour Organization conventions
Treaties concluded in 1973
Treaties entered into force in 1976
Child labour treaties
Minimum ages
Treaties of Albania
Treaties of Algeria
Treaties of Angola
Treaties of Antigua and Barbuda
Treaties of Argentina
Treaties of Armenia
Treaties of Austria
Treaties of Azerbaijan
Treaties of the Bahamas
Treaties of Bahrain
Treaties of Barbados
Treaties of the Byelorussian Soviet Socialist Republic
Treaties of Belgium
Treaties of Belize
Treaties of Benin
Treaties of Bolivia
Treaties of Bosnia and Herzegovina
Treaties of Botswana
Treaties of Brazil
Treaties of Brunei
Treaties of the People's Republic of Bulgaria
Treaties of Burkina Faso
Treaties of Burundi
Treaties of Cambodia
Treaties of Cameroon
Treaties of Cape Verde
Treaties of the Central African Republic
Treaties of Chad
Treaties of Chile
Treaties of the People's Republic of China
Treaties of Colombia
Treaties of the Comoros
Treaties of the Republic of the Congo
Treaties of Costa Rica
Treaties of Ivory Coast
Treaties of Croatia
Treaties of Cuba
Treaties of Cyprus
Treaties of the Czech Republic
Treaties of the Democratic Republic of the Congo
Treaties of Denmark
Treaties of Djibouti
Treaties of Dominica
Treaties of the Dominican Republic
Treaties of Ecuador
Treaties of Egypt
Treaties of El Salvador
Treaties of Equatorial Guinea
Treaties of Eritrea
Treaties of Estonia
Treaties of Ethiopia
Treaties of Fiji
Treaties of Finland
Treaties of France
Treaties of Gabon
Treaties of the Gambia
Treaties of Ghana
Treaties of Georgia (country)
Treaties of West Germany
Treaties of Greece
Treaties of Grenada
Treaties of Guatemala
Treaties of Guinea
Treaties of Guinea-Bissau
Treaties of Guyana
Treaties of Haiti
Treaties of Honduras
Treaties of Hungary
Treaties of Iceland
Treaties of Indonesia
Treaties of Ba'athist Iraq
Treaties of Ireland
Treaties of Israel
Treaties of Italy
Treaties of Jamaica
Treaties of Japan
Treaties of Jordan
Treaties of Kazakhstan
Treaties of Kenya
Treaties of Kiribati
Treaties of South Korea
Treaties of Kuwait
Treaties of Kyrgyzstan
Treaties of Laos
Treaties of Latvia
Treaties of Lebanon
Treaties of Lesotho
Treaties of the Libyan Arab Republic
Treaties of Lithuania
Treaties of Luxembourg
Treaties of North Macedonia
Treaties of Madagascar
Treaties of Malawi
Treaties of Malaysia
Treaties of the Maldives
Treaties of Mali
Treaties of Malta
Treaties of Myanmar
Treaties of Mauritania
Treaties of Mauritius
Treaties of Mexico
Treaties of Moldova
Treaties of Montenegro
Treaties of Mongolia
Treaties of Morocco
Treaties of Mozambique
Treaties of Namibia
Treaties of Nepal
Treaties of the Netherlands
Treaties of Nicaragua
Treaties of Niger
Treaties of Nigeria
Treaties of Norway
Treaties of Oman
Treaties of Pakistan
Treaties of Panama
Treaties of Papua New Guinea
Treaties of Paraguay
Treaties of Peru
Treaties of the Philippines
Treaties of the Polish People's Republic
Treaties of Portugal
Treaties of Qatar
Treaties of the Republic of Afghanistan
Treaties of Rwanda
Treaties of Saint Kitts and Nevis
Treaties of Saint Vincent and the Grenadines
Treaties of Samoa
Treaties of San Marino
Treaties of São Tomé and Príncipe
Treaties of Senegal
Treaties of Serbia and Montenegro
Treaties of Seychelles
Treaties of Sierra Leone
Treaties of Singapore
Treaties of Slovakia
Treaties of Slovenia
Treaties of the Socialist Republic of Romania
Treaties of the Solomon Islands
Treaties of South Africa
Treaties of South Sudan
Treaties of the Soviet Union
Treaties of Spain
Treaties of Sri Lanka
Treaties of the Republic of the Sudan (1985–2011)
Treaties of Eswatini
Treaties of Sweden
Treaties of Switzerland
Treaties of Syria
Treaties of Tajikistan
Treaties of Tanzania
Treaties of Thailand
Treaties of Togo
Treaties of Trinidad and Tobago
Treaties of Tunisia
Treaties of Turkey
Treaties of Turkmenistan
Treaties of Uganda
Treaties of the Ukrainian Soviet Socialist Republic
Treaties of the United Arab Emirates
Treaties of the United Kingdom
Treaties of Uruguay
Treaties of Uzbekistan
Treaties of Venezuela
Treaties of Vietnam
Treaties of Yemen
Treaties of Vanuatu
Treaties of Zambia
Treaties of Zimbabwe
Treaties extended to Aruba
Treaties of Yugoslavia
1973 in labor relations